Louisiana Ragin' Cajuns basketball may refer to either of the basketball teams that represent the University of Louisiana at Lafayette:
Louisiana Ragin' Cajuns men's basketball
Louisiana Ragin' Cajuns women's basketball